Jean Desmasures (29 August 1928 – 29 April 2012) was a French field hockey player. He competed at the 1952 Summer Olympics and the 1960 Summer Olympics.

References

External links
 

1928 births
2012 deaths
French male field hockey players
Olympic field hockey players of France
Field hockey players at the 1952 Summer Olympics
Field hockey players at the 1960 Summer Olympics
Field hockey players from Paris